The Abbotsford/Mission Times was a newspaper in Abbotsford, British Columbia.
 
The Abbotsford/Mission Times competed against the Abbotsford News and Mission City Record until Black Press purchased the Times from Glacier Media and announced in December 2013 that it would cease publishing the Times due to revenue losses and disinterest in staff at the Times transferring to Black Press.

See also
List of newspapers in Canada

References

2013 disestablishments in British Columbia
Abbotsford, British Columbia
Defunct newspapers published in British Columbia
Defunct weekly newspapers
Glacier Media
Publications with year of establishment missing
Publications disestablished in 2013
Weekly newspapers published in British Columbia